Godhi Banna Sadharana Mykattu is a 2016 Indian Kannada drama film written and directed by Hemanth Rao, making his debut, and produced by Pushkara Mallikarjun under Pushkar Films. The film stars Anant Nag and Rakshit Shetty in the lead roles with Achyuth Kumar, Sruthi Hariharan, Vasishta N. Simha and Ravikiran portraying supporting roles.
The movie was a commercial success at the box office.

The film revolves around Venkob Rao, a middle-aged man who suffers from Alzheimer's disease, going missing. His son Shiva who is worried by his father's disappearance embarks on a search with a female doctor. Venkob becomes entangled with a killer. The rest of the film involves whether Shiva finds his father or not.

The film's score and soundtrack were composed by Charan Raj. The film's cinematography and editing was handled by Nanda Kishore and Srikanth Shroff, respectively. The film had a worldwide release on June 3, 2016. Upon release, the film received positive critical response and became successful at the box-office. The film was remade in Tamil in 2018 as 60 Vayadu Maaniram.

Plot 

Venkob Rao suffers from Alzheimer's and has been admitted to an old age home by his career-driven son Shiva. Now settled in Mumbai, Shiva has come down to Bengaluru for a business meeting, the outcome of which could fulfill his long-standing dream of moving to the United States. Venkob Rao goes missing when Shiva takes him out shopping.

Meanwhile, a local civil servant is murdered while uncovering a land scam and Ranga is entrusted with making the murder seem like an accident. With Venkob Rao going missing, Shiva is forced to confront the decisions he has made in the past when his dream of going abroad is all but realized.

He begins looking for Venkob Rao reluctantly with the help of doctor Sahana from the old age home. Along this long journey, Shiva starts discovering little facets of his father's personality while forging a friendship with doctor Sahana. A clueless Venkob Rao ends up crossing paths with Ranga and his annoying young assistant Manja who are in the process of disposing the body of the civil servant. Kumar, a good Samaritan returning home, becomes entangled with Ranga, Manja and Venkob Rao. Shiva's search for Venkob Rao allows him to find all that's missing in his life while Ranga in Venkob Rao's presence finds something that he had lost years ago.

Ranga, Manja and Venkob stay in Kumar's home. Ranga threatens the family with death if they expose the truth about the murder to the police. To cover up the murder, however, Ranga's boss orders Ranga to kill Kumar, his family and Manja, which Ranga reluctantly accepts. However, he doesn't proceed with the murder and lies that he has to his boss. Manja is in love with a dancer Reshma who happens to be a cohort of Ranga's boss. Manja inadvertently reveals that Ranga has not carried out the murder by telling Reshma this. When Ranga's boss discovers that he has not committed the murder, he sends a policeman to murder Ranga, but in the ensuing fight, they both die. Saddened by Ranga's death, Manja retaliates by killing his boss and Reshma.

After this, Kumar who sees the missing poster of Venkob Rao calls Shiva and informs him about the whereabouts of his father. Shiva emotionally reunites with his father and also marries Sahana.

Cast 
 Anant Nag as Venkob Rao
 Rakshit Shetty as Shiva V. Rao
 Achyuth Kumar as Kumar
 Sruthi Hariharan as Dr. Sahana
 Vasishta N. Simha as Ranga
 Ravikiran Rajendran as Manja
 Sanchari Vijay in a cameo appearance
 Parameshwar (Kalamadyama) as Inspector 
 Patre Nagaraj
 Devendra
 Kartikeya

Production 
Having announced of making the film in 2014, Hemanth Rao, who made his debut as a director with the film, began filming 11 January 2015. The first schedule of the shooting took place predominantly in Bengaluru featuring lead actors Anant Nag and Rakshit Shetty. With Sruthi Hariharan, Achyuth Kumar and joining Vasishta N. Simha, the next schedule began on 19 January. Vasishta was initially in talks to play the character that Rakshit Shetty played in the film. Rao revealed that Nag plays the role of Venkob Rao, a regular office-goer in Bengaluru in the 1970s, who after having worked at the same company for over 40 years, goes missing. It was revealed in September 2015 that Nag would be portraying an Alzheimer's patient.
Talking about what inspired him to choose such a subject, he said, "As a kid, I used to watch the missing reports on television news. The following day, I used to wonder what happened to those who had gone missing the previous day - were they found? When I started meeting people who have had people go missing in their family, I realized that, for the family, the lack of closure about the person who has gone away is the most important aspect. While this was one thread of the story, the other important element is the relationship between a father and a son, something that I have always been fascinated with."

Soundtrack 

Charan Raj scored the film's music and for its soundtrack. The soundtrack album consists of nine tracks. The album was released on digital platforms such as Hungama, iTunes and Wynk Music on 16 March 2016, on a revenue-sharing basis.

Remake
Prakash Raj has purchased the rights to remake the movie in Tamil, Telugu and Hindi. The film has been remade in Tamil as 60 Vayadu Maaniram (2018) with Prakash Raj.

Awards

References

External links 
 
 

2016 films
Indian drama films
2010s Kannada-language films
Indian films about Alzheimer's disease
Films set in Bangalore
Films shot in Bangalore
Kannada films remade in other languages
2016 directorial debut films